C. J. Kuttappan is a folk artist from Kerala.

Kuttappan has performed in the US, Thailand, Singapore, Germany, Hong Kong, Sri Lanka, Andaman and Nicobar, and Gulf countries. Th

Kuttappan is the Chairman of Kerala Folklore Academy and Director, Thayillam - Folk Arts Research Center.

Kuttappan  has performed on Asianet, Surya, Amrita, Indiavision, JaiHind, Reporter, Doordarshan, Kappa TV, Jeevan. He has performed folk arts, speeches, and engaged in discussions and interviews  on AIR, DD.  From 2001- 2003 he was the  Coordinator, Folk Programmes, at Kairali TV

Biography
He was born in Chengannur, Pathanamthitta district, the eldest of four children of Kumaradas and Thankamma. His family moved to Udumbanchola in Idukki district when he was in fifth grade. In 1996, he formed his own folk music troupe Thailiyam.

Films 
Provided vocals and composed folksongs in the following Malayalam movies:

 Vasanthathinte Kanal Vazhikalil
 kashathinte Niram
 Bachelor Party
 Note Out
 Makaramanju
 Dr. Love
 Pazhashiraaja
 Nivedyam
 Mahasamudram
 Kisan
 Anyar
 Bheri
 Kannaki
 Karunam
 Richter Scale 7.6
 Sreedavalesan Nercha Music Album, Song By Sasi And Team. Nadaswaram, Panchavadyam, Chenda By Folk Artists

Awards
Kerala State Folklore Academy Award 2012
Samba Sivan Award
Kalamanikyam Award

Family
He and his wife Sudha have two children, Kala Kannan.

References 

Living people
Indian male folk singers
Malayali people
Singers from Kerala
People from Thiruvalla
Year of birth missing (living people)